This is a list of shipwrecks during the Great Lakes Storm of 1913.

Vessels gallery

See also

List of victims of the 1913 Great Lakes storm
List of shipwrecks

References

Brown, David G. (2002). White Hurricane. International Marine / McGraw-Hill. .

Vogel, Michael N. and Paul F. Redding, Maritime Buffalo,  Buffalo History, Lightship LV 82.

External links
University of Detroit Mercy S.J. Marine Historical Collection
Great Lakes Shipwrecks S
Tales of sea and riverside, Great Storm of 1913 (pictures of all the ships lost.)

1913
Great Lakes
Great Lakes-related lists
Great Lakes Storm Shipwrecks
Great Lakes Storm Shipwrecks
Great Lakes Storm Shipwrecks
Great Lakes Storm Shipwrecks
Great Lakes Storm Shipwrecks